Living on the Edge may refer to:

Film, television & radio
 Living on the Edge (film), a 2005 documentary by Rodrigue Jean
 Living on the Edge (British TV series), a 2007 British reality series
 Living on the Edge (Indian TV series), an Indian TV series about environmental issues
 "Living on the Edge", an episode of Disasters of the Century
 Living on the Edge, a religious radio show hosted by Chip Ingram

Music 
 Living on the Edge (Stéphane Pompougnac album), 2003, or the title song
 Living on the Edge (Dewey Redman album), 1989
 "Livin' on the Edge", a 1993 song by Aerosmith
 Living on the Edge, an album by Sandalinas